The Great Southern Trendkill is the eighth studio album by American heavy metal band Pantera, released on May 7, 1996, through East West Records. It reached number 4 on the Billboard 200 chart, and stayed on the chart for 16 weeks. During the album's production, Phil Anselmo recorded the vocals alone at Trent Reznor's Nothing Studios in New Orleans while Dimebag Darrell, Rex Brown, and Vinnie Paul recorded the music at Chasin Jason Studios in Dalworthington Gardens. This would be the Pantera's last studio album to be produced by Terry Date, who had worked with the band since Cowboys from Hell (1990).

Content
"Floods", the album's longest song, contains a guitar solo considered by many to be Dimebag Darrell's finest. Guitar World magazine voted it as the 32nd greatest guitar solo of all-time, Darrell's highest-ranking of three solos to make the list (the other two being his solos from "Cemetery Gates", ranked 35th, and "Walk", ranked 57th).

"10's" appears in the English dub of Dragon Ball Z: Broly – The Legendary Super Saiyan.

The album is available as downloadable content for the video game Rock Band, with the exception of "Suicide Note Pt. I".

Music and lyrics
Considered Pantera's most aggressive album, The Great Southern Trendkill is known for featuring much screaming, most notably on "Suicide Note Pt. II" and "The Great Southern Trendkill" while also featuring some of the fastest tempos and most down-tuned guitars ("The Underground in America" and "(Reprise) Sandblasted Skin" were played in A=425Hz standard D tuning, with the 6th string tuned to a low G.) that the band ever recorded. It also has a more experimental nature, such as the acoustic guitars and ballads.

Unlike Pantera's first three major label albums, the vocals are often double-tracked and layered to create a more "demonic" effect. An example of this can be heard in the chorus of "13 Steps to Nowhere", when Phil Anselmo's singing voice is backed up by high-pitched screaming, done by Seth Putnam of the band Anal Cunt. Screams done by Anselmo on the song "The Great Southern Trendkill" were compared to Putnam.

The lyrical themes on The Great Southern Trendkill include drugs, a flood that ends mankind, finding deeper meaning, anger, and the media. The album features elements of thrash metal and death metal, but is mostly considered a groove metal album overall.

Critical reception

Melody Maker (May 25, 1996, p. 49) - "It makes my brain hurt, my eyes water and my genitalia retract like a startled turtle. I cannot think of higher recommendation, considering the kind of album it is. If it made me feel all warm and gooey or tearful and lovelorn, then it would be a pitiful failure by its own lights."
Spin (July 1996, p. 96) - "...mature speedmetal and perfect summer fun: twisted power ballads, rap-style toasting, almost radio-worthy melodies, plus all the right jackhammer drum jolts, wrestler bellows, and guitar lurch..."

Reissue
On August 12, 2016, Pantera announced the release of a 20th anniversary edition of The Great Southern Trendkill for October 21. The reissue features two discs, including a remastered version of the original album as well as 12 unreleased tracks (these include instrumentals, as well as alternative mixes and live recordings from the Dynamo Festival in 1998). In addition, a separate LP named The Great Southern Outtakes was released. It consists of songs also released on disc 2 of Trendkill's reissue except for the intro and early mix of "Suicide Note Part l".

Track listing

Personnel
Pantera
Phil Anselmo – lead vocals, backing vocals, production
Dimebag Darrell – guitars,  12-string acoustic guitar on "Suicide Note Pt. I", backing vocals, production
Rex Brown – bass, backing vocals, production
Vinnie Paul – drums, backing vocals, production, recording, mixing

Additional personnel
Seth Putnam – additional vocals on "The Great Southern Trendkill", "War Nerve", "13 Steps to Nowhere", and "Suicide Note Pt. II"
Ross Karpelman – keyboards on "Suicide Note Pt. I" and "Living Through Me (Hells' Wrath)"

Technical personnel
Terry Date – producer, recording, mixing
Ulrich Wild – recording

Charts

Certifications

References

1996 albums
Albums produced by Terry Date
East West Records albums
Pantera albums